Szilárd or Szilard  is a Hungarian given name or surname. It is a Hungarian version (literary translation) of the name Constantine. It may refer to:

People

First name
Szilárd Bogdánffy (1911–1953), Hungarian catholic bishop
Szilárd Borbély (1963–2014), Hungarian writer
Szilárd Devecseri (born 1990), Hungarian football player
Szilárd Éles (born 1987), Hungarian football player
Szilárd Keresztes (born 1932), Hungarian bishop
Szilárd Kovács (born 1991), Hungarian football player 
Szilárd Németh (born 1977), Slovak football player
Szilárd Németh (politician) (born 1964), Hungarian politician
Szilárd Tóth (born 1973), Hungarian ice dancer

Surname
Leo Szilard (1898–1964), Hungarian physicist

Other uses
38442 Szilárd, main belt asteroid discovered in 1999
Einstein–Szilárd letter, sent to Franklin Roosevelt in 1939
Einstein–Szilárd refrigerator or Einstein refrigerator, a type of absorption refrigerator with no moving parts
Szilard (crater)
Szilárd petition

Hungarian words and phrases
Hungarian masculine given names
Hungarian-language surnames